Calvin Tsiebo (born 1902, year of death missing) was a Malagasy politician during the era on Malagasy Republic and former Vice President of Madagascar. 

Tsiebo was born in southern Madagascar. He became a civil servant during the French colonial administration. He was elected to the provincial assembly of Toliara in 1949. Tsiebo became one of the founders of Social Democratic Party of Madagascar in 1956.  

In October 1960, he was elected as the president of the new National Assembly, but left that position in November 1960 upon appointment as Vice President of Philibert Tsiranana. Tsiebo was one of the loyal supporters of Tsiranana and was in charge of Malagasy government during Tsiranana's serious illness in 1970. Tsiebo lost his political position alongside Tsiranana in October 1972.

References

1902 births
Year of death missing
Malagasy politicians
Social Democratic Party of Madagascar politicians
Presidents of the National Assembly (Madagascar)
Vice presidents of Madagascar